Be Here Soon is the fourth studio album by Swedish audiovisual project iamamiwhoami, consisting of singer and songwriter Jonna Lee and record producer Claes Björklund. It was released on 3 June 2022 on Lee's label To whom it may concern. It is the first studio album from the project in eight years.

The album took a more folk-inspired direction than previous projects from the group, returning to Lee's roots as a solo artist. The album's visuals contain themes such as Lee's struggle with obsessive-compulsive disorder, as well as her pregnancy.

Release
The visual album was announced by Lee through social media on 31 March 2022. The album's first chapter and lead single "Don't Wait for Me" was released on the same day, with each subsequent chapter being released weekly. The announcement was largely a surprise, with no previous information from any of the crew hinting towards another iamamiwhoami album.

The release date of the album was chosen before Lee knew she was pregnant, and the release date coincidentally aligned with her due date. Lee's baby was born on 25 May 2022; Be Here Soon came out in digital format on June 3.

Physical editions of Be Here Soon were released in limited CD+DVD and 12-inch vinyl LP formats, as well as a CD, DVD and LP collectors bundle with exclusive items available exclusively on To whom it may concern.'s website, originally slated for a September 2022 release.

Critical reception

Be Here Soon received generally positive reviews. Simon Heggum of Gaffa Denmark was particularly enthusiastic, naming the album a "folktronic masterpiece" containing Lee's "strongest vocal performance to date".

Tour background
Following the album's release, Lee announced the first leg of a world tour on her social media; the tour started in Amsterdam on 26 February 2023 and continued on in the United States and Canada throughout April and May 2023. iamamiwhoami performed with a full band for the first time in ten years and a few special guests such as Imogen Heap joined Lee on stage on specific dates.

Tour dates

Cancelled shows

Track listing

References 

2022 albums
Visual albums
Iamamiwhoami albums